The 1976–77 Colorado Rockies season was the Rockies' first season. The Kansas City Scouts relocated in the off-season to Denver. With the World Hockey Association's Denver Spurs leaving Denver in a midnight move to Ottawa, Ontario just about 10 months earlier, Denver would get a franchise and the team would be anointed the Colorado Rockies. The team moved from Kansas City, which was a two-year NHL franchise that struggled from the beginning.

The team took to the ice for their first regular season against the Toronto Maple Leafs on October 6, 1976. Rockies goalie Doug Favell played extremely well stopping 39 of the Toronto 41 shots on net. Wilf Paiement notching one goal, two assists and a fight.  Rookie Larry Skinner scored the first NHL regular season goal for the franchise.  The final score was 4–2.

The team was competitive in the weak Smythe Division for a major portion of the season. Early in the season, the Rockies picked up wins by either the goon tactics of Steve Durbano, or through the heroic feats of their goalies, Doug Favell and Michel Plasse.  Bill McKenzie was also a goalie for the Rockies but played in only five games.

Offseason

NHL draft
The draft was held while the franchise was in Kansas City.

Regular season

On some nights, the Rockies could come back from two and three goal deficits to get ties or the occasional win, but then the next night the team would be overmatched by one of the elite teams in the league.

Steve Durbano
Goonery was a big part of hockey in 1976 and the Rockies' goon at the beginning of the season was Steve Durbano.  After losing three in a row, Durbano tried to get the Rockies going with goon tactics. Despite his goon tactics, Durbano did not last long with the franchise, playing only 18 games; his penalty minute total in that handful of games, however, was sufficient to lead the team for the season.

Goaltending
Teams were launching over 40 and 50 shots on net against Plasse and Favell. After a November game against the defending Stanley Cup champion Montreal Canadiens, Plasse was noticeably hurt.
The Canadiens were blasting the puck towards Plasse all game. One shot off the stick of Canadiens player Murray Wilson put Plasse down in the second period with an arm injury, but the goalie was able to get up and finish the game. The Rockies' forwards were able to come back twice from two-goal deficits to finally tie the game at three a piece with just about nine minutes left in the third.  However it was Plasse preserved the tie stand by stopping 47 of 50 shots, 20 in the third period.

Ray Miron
A November 2–1 loss to the Cleveland Barons raised the ire of General Manager Ray Miron. During the second intermission, Miron burst into the locker room and said that if the Rockies didn't pull the game out, he was going to call up three minor leaguers and send down three Rockies.  Miron kept his word after the 2–1 Rockies loss and called up Mike Kitchen, Paul Gardner and Jim McElmury.  Gardner made a quick impact, tallying five goals in his first four NHL games.  Kitchen helped shore up the defense.   Despite a 5–3 loss to the Bruins, Bruin coach Don Cherry raved that he was "impressed" with the Rockies.

Playoff contention
The Rockies would be successful in upending divisional rivals the Minnesota North Stars.  It took three goals in the third period, including two in the final two minutes, to win the game 4–2.  After the game, coach Johnny Wilson was raving for his team. The Rockies had taken over sole possession of third place in the Smythe Division with the win.
By February 1, the Rockies had a two-point third-place lead over Minnesota and Vancouver.  The Rockies would face the New York Rangers on February 1, and the goaltender Plasse would stop 48 of 50 Ranger shots. His performance would help the Rockies to a 5–2 win.  The win extended their third place lead to four points.
A February 6 game against the Pittsburgh Penguins saw the Rockies score four unanswered third period goals to win the game 5–2. The Rockies had a former member of the WHA's Denver Spurs on the club. Ron Delorme, the former Spur, would score the game winner in his first stint with the team.  He had been playing with Baltimore in the Southern Hockey League.
The Rockies continued to be successful. The club enjoyed an 8–6 win against Minnesota, as it extended their third place margin to five points ahead of them.  The Rockies were only five points behind second-place Chicago.  On February 16, the Rockies won their fourth game of the season against the Detroit Red Wings. A February 20 triumph against the North Stars would be the last highlight of the season for the club.
By March 27, the Rockies were officially out of the playoff hunt. This was attributed to an 18-game winless streak that began on February 22.  The goaltending of Doug Favell and Plasse kept the team in contention during many games.  A typical night saw the goaltenders facing 50 shots.  When the Rockies were based in Kansas City, the Scouts had finished their tenure in Kansas City by only winning one game in their final 44. The winless streak finally stopped in a 6–3 win against the Vancouver Canucks. This was the second-to-the-last game of the season. The Rockies season ended with a loss to the LA Kings.

Final standings

Schedule and results

Player statistics

Regular season
Scoring

Goaltending

Note: GP = Games played; G = Goals; A = Assists; Pts = Points; +/- = Plus/minus; PIM = Penalty minutes; PPG=Power-play goals; SHG=Short-handed goals; GWG=Game-winning goals
      MIN=Minutes played; W = Wins; L = Losses; T = Ties; GA = Goals against; GAA = Goals against average; SO = Shutouts;

Awards and records

Transactions

Farm teams
In 1976–77, the Rockies had affiliations with three different teams, including: the Flint Generals, the Greensboro Generals, and the Rhode Island Reds.

References
 Rockies on Hockey Database

Colorado Rockies (NHL) seasons
Colorado
Colorado
Colorado
Colorado